Padiham railway station in Station Road, Padiham, Lancashire, England was on a branch line (usually known as the Great Harwood loop) of the East Lancashire Line from Burnley to Blackburn.

History
The line between Padiham and Rose Grove opened in 1875. West of Padiham it opened two years later as a result of difficulties in constructing the embankments between Great Harwood and Simonstone.

It was closed to regular passenger services on 2 December 1957 but occasional special trains operated until completely closed in 1968. Subsequently the station was later demolished. The railway line from Burnley to Simonstone was retained for continuing deliveries of coal to Padiham power station until the power station closed in 1993.

Greenway
Lancashire County Council began work in 2005 to convert part of the line to a footpath/bridleway/cycle path to be called Padiham Greenway. The Greenway was officially opened on 24 June 2010. It is known by locals as the old railway.

It links to the River Calder Greenway and the towpath of the Leeds and Liverpool Canal to form a circular route and also has a branch to Gawthorpe Hall a National Trust property in Padiham.

References

Former Lancashire and Yorkshire Railway stations
Railway stations in Great Britain opened in 1877
Railway stations in Great Britain closed in 1957
Disused railway stations in Burnley
Padiham